In Greek mythology, King Teucer (Ancient Greek: Τεῦκρος Teûkros) was said to have been the son of the river-god Scamander and the nymph Idaea.

Mythology 
Before the arrival of Dardanus, the land that would eventually be called Dardania (and later still the Troad) was known as Teucria and the inhabitants as Teucrians, after Turkos.

According to Virgil, Teucer was originally from Crete but left the island during a great famine with a third of its inhabitants. They settled near the Scamander river, named after Teucer's father, not far from the Rhaetean promontory. However, Dionysius of Halicarnassus states that Teucer had come to the Troad from Attica where he was a chief of the Xypetȇ region. In both cases he ended up in the region which would be known as the Troad.

His company was said to have been greatly annoyed by a vast number of mice during their first night in the region. Teucer had previously been directed by an oracle before leaving Crete to build a settlement in the place where he should be attacked in the night-time by an enemy sprung from the earth or "where the earth-born should attack them"; since mice had attacked them during the night he resolved to settle there. He probably founded the city of Hamaxitus and established it as his capital. Teucer is said to have had a felicitous reign as he was successful in all of his undertakings. He was said to have been the first to build a temple to Apollo Sminthius or Apollo the "destroyer of mice" since Apollo was said to have destroyed mice infesting that area during Teucer's reign.

Batea (also known as Batia or Arisba), King Teucer's daughter and only child, was given in marriage to Dardanus. In Lycophron's Alexandra, Dardanus was said to wed Arisba from "Crete's royal house". Dardanus received land on Mount Ida from his father-in-law when Teucer died since he did not have a biological son. There Dardanus founded the city of Dardania. After Teucer's death, his kingdom was incorporated into that of Dardanus and the entire region came to be known as Dardania. Yet in later times, the people of Troy often referred to themselves as "Teucrians". For example, Aeneas is called the "great captain of the Teucrians". In most myths mentioning King Teucer, he is described as being a distant ancestor of the Trojans. Diodorus states that Teucer was "the first to rule as king over the land of Troy" while in the Aeneid, Anchises recalls him being the Trojans' "first forefather". This suggests that King Teucer was considered the first figure to bear the bloodline of the Trojans as his father Scamander did not have such acclamations.

Family tree

See also

Teucer
Tjeker

Notes

References 

 Apollodorus, The Library with an English Translation by Sir James George Frazer, F.B.A., F.R.S. in 2 Volumes, Cambridge, MA, Harvard University Press; London, William Heinemann Ltd. 1921. ISBN 0-674-99135-4. Online version at the Perseus Digital Library. Greek text available from the same website.
Diodorus Siculus, The Library of History translated by Charles Henry Oldfather. Twelve volumes. Loeb Classical Library. Cambridge, Massachusetts: Harvard University Press; London: William Heinemann, Ltd. 1989. Vol. 3. Books 4.59–8. Online version at Bill Thayer's Web Site
 Diodorus Siculus, Bibliotheca Historica. Vol 1-2. Immanel Bekker. Ludwig Dindorf. Friedrich Vogel. in aedibus B. G. Teubneri. Leipzig. 1888-1890. Greek text available at the Perseus Digital Library.
 Dionysus of Halicarnassus, Roman Antiquities. English translation by Earnest Cary in the Loeb Classical Library, 7 volumes. Harvard University Press, 1937-1950. Online version at Bill Thayer's Web Site
 Dionysius of Halicarnassus, Antiquitatum Romanarum quae supersunt, Vol I-IV. . Karl Jacoby. In Aedibus B.G. Teubneri. Leipzig. 1885. Greek text available at the Perseus Digital Library.
 Hard, Robin, The Routledge Handbook of Greek Mythology: Based on H.J. Rose's "Handbook of Greek Mythology", Psychology Press, 2004, . Google Books.
 Lycophron, The Alexandra  translated by Alexander William Mair. Loeb Classical Library Volume 129. London: William Heinemann, 1921. Online version at the Topos Text Project.
 Lycophron, Alexandra translated by A.W. Mair. London: William Heinemann; New York: G.P. Putnam's Sons. 1921. Greek text available at the Perseus Digital Library.
 Publius Vergilius Maro, Aeneid. Theodore C. Williams. trans. Boston. Houghton Mifflin Co. 1910. Online version at the Perseus Digital Library.
 Publius Vergilius Maro, Bucolics, Aeneid, and Georgics. J. B. Greenough. Boston. Ginn & Co. 1900. Latin text available at the Perseus Digital Library.
 Strabo, The Geography of Strabo. Edition by H.L. Jones. Cambridge, Mass.: Harvard University Press; London: William Heinemann, Ltd. 1924. Online version at the Perseus Digital Library.
 Strabo, Geographica edited by A. Meineke. Leipzig: Teubner. 1877. Greek text available at the Perseus Digital Library.

Children of Potamoi
Mythological kings of Troy
Kings in Greek mythology
Cretan characters in Greek mythology